Esther Croft (born 1945) is a Quebec educator and writer.

She was born in Quebec City and was educated at the Université Laval. She studied with Élisabeth Bing in Paris on how to lead writing workshops. On her return, she taught theatre and creative writing at the Université Laval. Croft has led writing workshops for people from various professions; she also established Les Ateliers d'écriture Esther Croft. She has written for various periodicals such as Châtelaine, La revue de la nouvelle, Arcade, XYZ, Le Devoir and La parole métèque.

Selected works 
 Au commencement était le froid, stories (1993), received the Prix Desjardins from the Salon du livre de Québec in 1994 and was also a finalist for the Prix de l'Institut canadien de Québec, the Governor General's Award for French-language fiction and the Signet d'or from Radio-Québec
 Tu ne mourras pas, stories (1997)
 De belles paroles, novel (2002)
 Le reste du temps, stories (2007), received the Prix de création littéraire for adult literature from Quebec City and the Prix Adrienne-Choquette, and was included on the short list for the Governor General's Literary Awards
 Les rendez-vous manqués, stories (2011), received the Prix littéraires des enseignants AQPF-ANEL in 2011

References 

1945 births
Living people
Canadian short story writers in French
Canadian women short story writers
20th-century Canadian women writers
20th-century Canadian short story writers
21st-century Canadian women writers
21st-century Canadian novelists
21st-century Canadian short story writers
Writers from Quebec City
Université Laval alumni
Canadian women novelists